Janakavaram Panguluru is a village in Bapatla district of the Indian state of Andhra Pradesh. It is the mandal headquarters of Janakavaram Panguluru mandal in Ongole revenue division.

References 

Villages in Prakasam district
Mandal headquarters in Prakasam district